
Gmina Halinów is an urban-rural gmina (administrative district) in Mińsk County, Masovian Voivodeship, in east-central Poland.

Villages
Apart from the town of Halinów, Gmina Halinów contains the villages and settlements of Brzeziny, Budziska, Chobot, Cisie, Desno, Długa Kościelna, Długa Szlachecka, Grabina, Hipolitów, Józefin, Kazimierów, Królewskie Brzeziny, Krzewina, Michałów, Mrowiska, Nowy Konik, Okuniew, Stary Konik, Wielgolas Brzeziński, Wielgolas Duchnowski, Zagórze and Żwirówka.

Neighbouring gminas
Gmina Halinów is bordered by the towns of Sulejówek and Zielonka, and by the gminas of Dębe Wielkie and Wiązowna.

References

Polish official population figures 2006

Halinow
Mińsk County